The men's 15 kilometre freestyle cross-country skiing competition at the 2010 Winter Olympics in Vancouver, Canada, was held on 15 February at Whistler Olympic Park in Whistler, British Columbia, at 12:30 PST.

Each skier starts at 30-second intervals, skiing the entire 15 kilometre course. Estonia's Andrus Veerpalu is both the two-time defending Olympic and World champion in this event, though all three were held in the classical event. Norway's Lars Berger won the 2007 world championships when it was in freestyle. The final World Cup event in men's 15 km freestyle prior to the 2010 Games took place on 5 February at Canmore, Alberta, and was won by Italy's Giorgio Di Centa.

Veerpalu did not participate to the event being in freestyle while Berger did not participate to the fact that the biathlon men's 12.5 km pursuit would take place the next day. Di Centa finished tenth in the event. Cologna is the first Swiss to win a gold medal in cross-country skiing at the Winter Olympics.

Results

References

External links
2010 Winter Olympics results: Men's 15 km Free, from https://web.archive.org/web/20100222080013/http://www.vancouver2010.com/ retrieved 2010-02-15.
2010 Winter Olympics February 14, 2010 men's 15 km freestyle start list.

Men's cross-country skiing at the 2010 Winter Olympics
Men's 15 kilometre cross-country skiing at the Winter Olympics